Chrissy Monroe is an Italian-American entrepreneur and reality television personality, best known for her appearance on VH1's Love & Hip Hop: New York season 5.

Early life
Monroe was born on September 7, 1972, and she was born and raised in Baltimore, Maryland, and endured a rough childhood, including homelessness as a teen. She started her television career as a regular fixture on the late night dance show "Shakedown", and in minor roles on a Baltimore City Cable soap opera at Mo'Nique's Comedy Club. She moved to New York at the age of 29, where she became a brand ambassador for Pabst Brewing Company, and made appearances on Michael Moore's The Awful Truth. She subsequently launched her own talent and modelling development company called LeJeu Entertainment.

Career
In 2014, Monroe joined the cast of VH1's Love & Hip Hop: New York in season five, which chronicled her relationship struggles with rapper Chink Santana.

In 2015, Monroe joined the contributing staff of Hip Hop Weekly with her advice column, Love Talk with Chrissy Monroe.

In 2018, Monroe appeared in an episode of Dr. Phil, titled "Love, Hip Hop & Cyber-Stalking?".

Philanthropy 
In 2016, Monroe launched her own non-profit foundation Survive to Thrive Global, providing resources to domestic violence survivors. Monroe also serves on the board of directors of Celebrity Cat Walk, raising funds and awareness for National Animal Rescue, alongside Jamie Foxx, Nicole Richie and Melissa Rivers.

References 

Living people
People from Baltimore
Writers from Maryland
American women writers
Participants in American reality television series
21st-century American women
1972 births